Pseudomonas clemancea is a species of Pseudomonas bacteria which was first discovered in the North of England. The specific epithet clemancea was given by microbiologist Pattanathu Rahman at Teesside University to bestow the CLEMANCE (Clean Environment Management Centre).  This bacterium has DNA coding distinct from existing species and has unique properties developed in response to the contaminated soil from which it comes.

Biosurfactant from Pseudomonas clemancea
Surfactants work by reducing surface tension between two liquids or a liquid and a solid. Biosurfactants, surface-active agents of biological origin, have environment-friendly properties; they are bio-degradable, non-toxic and can be made organically using local raw material and producers. Biosurfactants can be used in soaps, detergents, medical ointments, or as emulsifiers, i.e. within ice cream, facial cream, or sun lotion.  P. clemancea produces rhamnolipids type of biosurfactants to detoxify oil and chemicals contaminants in the ground.

Further reading
 A triangle study of human, instrument and bioelectronic nose for non-destructive sensing of seafood freshness
 Production of rhamnolipid biosurfactants by Pseudomonas aeruginosa DS10-129 in a microfluidic bioreactor 
 Bacterial communities in systemic plant parts subjected to a fungal trunk disease 
Advances in Pseudomonadaceae Research and Application: 2011 Edition 
Environmental Sustainability: Role of Green Technologies

References

Pseudomonadales
Undescribed species